The Piaggio P.166 is an Italian twin-engine pusher-type utility aircraft developed by Piaggio Aero. The aircraft model name was Portofino, and is also known as Albatross in South African military service.

Design and development

The basic P.166 was a development of the P.136 amphibian and flew for the first time on 26 November 1957. The P.166 had a new fuselage and tail unit but retained the wing and engines from the P.136. Several were purchased for use as executive transports or as feeder and taxi aircraft. The improved P.166B was more powerful and had up to ten seats; a prototype was first flown on 27 March 1962.

A further version, the 12-seater P.166C with improved undercarriage, first flew on 2 October 1964.

A turboprop-powered variant, the P.166D, was developed with Lycoming LTP101 engines and it first flew on 3 July 1976.

Variants

P.166
Prototypes powered by  Lycoming GSO-480-B1C6 engines, three built.
P.166AL1
First production version with non-slanted cockpit side windows. Accommodation for two pilots and six–eight passengers. Powered by 340 hp (250 kW) Lycoming GSO-480-B1C6 engines, 29 built.
P.166B Portofino
Revised, more powerful version with longer nose. Powered by two 380 hp (283 kW) Lycoming IGSO-540-A1C engines. Five built.
P.166BL2/APH
Photo survey aircraft for Italian Air Force. Two built.
P.166CL2
Feederliner version of P.166B with external landing gear pods to allow a revised cabin giving room for up to 12 passengers. Two built. or another source gives four built
P.166DL3
Light utility transport version, powered by two 450 kW (600 hp) Lycoming LTP101-600 turboprop engines. 14 built including sub-variants.
P.166DL3/APH
Photo survey aircraft version of -DL3. Six built for Italian Air Force.
P.166DL3/MAR
Maritime patrol version of DL3. Two built for Somalia.
P.166DL3/SEM
Paramilitary maritime patrol (SEM - Sorveglianza Ecologia e Marittima - Maritime and ecological surveillance) version of DL3. 12 aircraft built for Italian Coast Guard and ten for Guardia di Finanza.
P.166DP1
Re-engined version with  Pratt & Whitney PT6A-121 turboprops. Eight converted (two from -DL3 and six from -DL3/SEM) for Guardia di Finanza.
P.166M
Military version of P.166A, 49 built for Italian air force.
P.166S Albatross
Coastal patrol, search and rescue version of the South African Air Force with longer P.166B-type nose and larger tip tanks, 20 built.

Operators

Air Associated 
Air Research 
Ansett-ANA
Ansett-MAL
Australian Federal Government
Confederate Airways 
East Coast Airways
Forrester Stephen Aviation 
GAAF Air Charter 
MacRobertson Miller Airlines 
Motif Air 
Papuan Air Transport
Papuan Airlines
Queensland Airlines
South Pacific Airways - SPA 
Tasman Airlines

Alitalia
Italian Air Force received 49 P.166M between 1960 and 1968, two P.166BL2/APH photo survey aircraft and six P.166-DL3/APH photo survey aircraft.
Corps of the Port Captaincies - Coast Guard received 12 P.166-DL3/SEM between 1988 and 1990. Retired July 2017.
Guardia di Finanza received two ex-Alitalia P.166-DL3 as trainers/utility aircraft in 1990 and ten new-built P.166-DL3/SEM between 1991 and 1995. Eight aircraft converted to P.166DP1 standard. Planned to remain in service until 2020.
Italian Ministry of Merchant Marine

Somalian Aeronautical Corps purchased two P.166-DL3 utility aircraft and two P.166-DL3/MAR maritime patrol aircraft in 1980.

South African Air Force
27 Squadron SAAF

Notable accidents and incidents
 On 14 August 2011 two privately owned P.166s (formerly with the South African Air Force) flying in formation crashed near Tzaneen in South Africa when they both flew into a cliff face near the summit of Mamotswiri Peak in dense mist. All thirteen on board the two aircraft were killed.

Specifications (P.166-DL3)

See also

References

 Marcellino, Dino. "Piaggione". Air International, Vol. 94 No.2, February 2018. . pp. 88–91.
 Niccoli, Ricardo. "Piaggione! The Varied Career of Piaggio's P.166 Pusher". Air International, Vol. 82 No. 4, April 2012. ISSN 0306-5634. pp. 86–91.
 Simpson, R.W. Airlife's General Aviation, Shrewsbury, England: Airlife Publishing,  1991, 
 Stroud, John. "Post War Propliners: Piaggio P.134 & P.166". Aeroplane Monthly, Vol 22 No 4, April 1994. pp. 64–67.
Taylor, John W. R. Jane's All The World's Aircraft 1961–62. London: Sampson Low, Marston and Company, 1961.
Taylor, John W. R. Jane's All The World's Aircraft 1965–66. London: Sampson Low, Marston and Company, 1965.
Taylor, John W. R. Jane's All The World's Aircraft 1976–77. London: Jane's Yearbooks, 1976. .

External links

1950s Italian civil utility aircraft
P.166
Twin-engined pusher aircraft
Twin-engined turboprop aircraft
High-wing aircraft
Aircraft first flown in 1957